Matthew Burke (born 4 February 1997) is an Irish rugby union player who is currently a member of the Connacht academy. He plays as a prop, and represents Corinthians in the All-Ireland League.

Early life
Born in Lewisham, London, Burke moved to Ireland when he was one year old, settling in Ballinrobe, County Mayo, where his fathers parents were from. He first began playing rugby aged 6 with the local club in Ballinrobe, before joining Galwegians in 2015, and represented Connacht at various age grade levels, as well as winning a cap for the Ireland schoolboys team in February 2015.

Connacht
Whilst still in the academy, Burke made his senior competitive debut for Connacht in their 34–14 away defeat against English side Sale Sharks during the 2018–19 Challenge Cup on 20 October 2018. Burke signed a professional contract with the province in April 2019, which will see him join the senior squad ahead of the 2019–20 season.

References

External links
Connacht Academy Profile
Pro14 Profile

1997 births
Living people
People from Lewisham
Irish rugby union players
Galwegians RFC players
Connacht Rugby players
Rugby union props
Rugby union players from Lewisham